Spinymussel may refer to:

 Elliptio spinosa or Altamaha spinymussel, also known as the Georgia spinymussel
 Elliptio steinstansana or Tar River spinymussel